Keith Hill may refer to:

 Keith Hill (politician) (born 1943), British politician
 Keith Hill (footballer) (born 1969), English football player and manager
 Keith Hill (musical instrument maker) (born 1948)

See also
 Keith Hills Country Club, a residential golf course community in Buies Creek, North Carolina, US
 Hill (surname), a surname (including a list of people with the name)